Desa Nisa (English: A Certain Look) is a 1975 Sri Lankan drama film directed by Lester James Peries. The film stars Joe Abeywickrema as Nirudaka, an ugly man who worries that his blind wife will leave him if she regains her sight.

Peries made the film as a vehicle for Joe Abeywickrema. The source material was a Gunasena Galappatti play which was made more accessible to a lay audience by Galappatti on Peries' urging. Critics were puzzled by the film and wrote that it was Peries' most mysterious.

Plot
Nirudaka (Joe Abeywickrema) is an ugly man who is only loved by his mother (Denawaka Hamine) and taunted by others. He falls in love with blind Sundari (Sriyani Amarasena) and they get married.

The mother then feels obliged to cure Sundari's blindness much to Nirudaka's chagrin and takes her to a hermit (Ravindra Randeniya) with healing powers. Nirudaka does not wish her to regain her sight, but against his underlying wish he and his mother accompany Sundari to get her healed with the aid of the hermit, who resides atop a mountain.

Cast
 Joe Abeywickrama as Nirukada
 Sriyani Amarasena as Sundari
 Denawaka Hamine as Nirukada's mother
 Ravindra Randeniya as Hermit
 Seetha Kumari as Nirukada's aunt
 Preethi Randeniya as Younger village girl
 Agra Sajivani as Older village girl
 Sriyani Perera as Hermit's former patient
 Somapala Dharmapriya as Shirtless villager
 Victor Wickremage as Villager with mustache

References

1975 films
Films directed by Lester James Peries
Films set in Sri Lanka (1948–present)
1975 drama films
Sri Lankan drama films